The Griffin Elementary School is a school building in Lakeland, Florida. It is part of the Polk County Public Schools district. The original school building was built in 1932. On June 5, 2007, this building was added to the U.S. National Register of Historic Places as the Griffin Grammar School.

Gallery

References

External links

 

Public elementary schools in Florida
Schools in Lakeland, Florida
National Register of Historic Places in Polk County, Florida